The 1964 Campeonato Profesional was the 17th season of Colombia's top-flight football league. 13 teams competed against one another. Millonarios won the league for the ninth time in its history and fourth in a row, defending successfully the title won in the previous three seasons.

Background and league system
The same 13 teams from the last tournament competed in this one. The tournament was once again played under a round-robin format, with every team playing each other four times (twice at home and twice away) for a total of 48 matches. Teams received two points for a win and one point for a draw. If two or more teams were tied on points, places were determined by goal difference. The team with the most points became the champion of the league. Millonarios won the championship for the ninth time. The runners-up were Cúcuta Deportivo.

Teams

Final standings

Results

First turn

Second turn

Top goalscorers

Source: RSSSF.com Colombia 1964

References

External links 
Dimayor Official Page

1964 in Colombian football
Colombia
Categoría Primera A seasons